Bengt Nordenberg (April 22, 1822 – December 18, 1902) was a Swedish artist. He  belonged to the Düsseldorf school of painting and is best known for his genre paintings with everyday life scenes from the Dalarna, Skåne and Blekinge areas of Sweden. He moved to Düsseldorf in the 1850s.

Biography
Nordenberg was born at Jämshög in Blekinge County, Sweden. He was one of nine siblings born to Per Jönsson Nord (1785-1854) and his wife Sissa Bengtsdotter (b. 1792). He grew up in poverty and became an apprentice to a painter in Sölvesborg.

In 1843 he fulfilled his wish to come to Stockholm and study at the Royal Swedish Academy of Arts. In the autumn of 1851, he went to the Düsseldorf Academy, where first Theodor Hildebrandt and then later, Adolph Tidemand became his teachers. In particular, the latter had a big influence on Nordenberg's painting style and subject matter. For some time he worked as an assistant to Tidemand, making reproductions of his paintings.  Nordenberg also painted pictures of middle-class and upper-class life, and also religious paintings and altarpieces. He painted altarpieces in several Småland churches, including at  Stenbrohult in Älmhult and  Gårdsby  in Växjö.

In 1856, Nordenberg received a travel grant from the Swedish state. He studied with French history painter Thomas Couture (1815–1879) for one and a half years, made a short stop in Düsseldorf, and in the autumn of 1858 he went to Rome. He returned soon to Düsseldorf, where he settled for life. From 1856 to 1889 he was a member of Malkasten, an artists' association there. He also gave private lessons to Swedish artists including Peter Eskilsson (1820-1872),  Augusta Jensen  (1858-1936) and  his nephew Henrik Nordenberg (1857-1928).

Personal life
In 1855, Nordenberg married Nanny Maria Charlotta Sutthof (1831-1905).

Gallery

References

Other sources
Ann-Marie Elmqvist (1994) Bengt Nordenberg: folklivsmålaren (A.-M. Elmqvist)

External links
Bengt Nordenberg in Nordisk familjebok 

1822 births
1902 deaths
People from Blekinge County
Kunstakademie Düsseldorf alumni
19th-century Swedish painters
Swedish male painters
Swedish genre painters
Düsseldorf school of painting
19th-century Swedish male artists